Baltimore National Cemetery is a United States National Cemetery located along Maryland Route 144 on both sides of the boundary between the neighborhoods of Beechfield in Baltimore City and Catonsville in Baltimore County. It encompasses . , the cemetery has nearly 46,000 interments.    It was listed on the National Register of Historic Places in 2016.

A kiosk located on the side of the cemetery's administration building lists the names of veterans and dependents buried in this and two other cemeteries: Annapolis National Cemetery and Loudon Park National Cemetery. The kiosk also provides map locations for each grave.

History 
The area of the Baltimore National Cemetery was once part of an elevated site in Baltimore, referred to as early as 1750 as the Cloud-Capped estate. It was originally owned by the Baltimore Company and Charles Carroll of Carrollton.  In 1890 it was acquired by Blanchard and Susan Randall. When the nearby Loudon Park National Cemetery was deemed full, the War Department surveyed the area for a new site. In 1936 the federal government took possession of the land for a cost of $95,000, and began converting the estate to "Little Arlington". The old mansion was demolished, fences were put up, roads were constructed, and landscaping was done as part of a Works Progress Administration to invest in infrastructure during the Great Depression. The first interment took place on December 22, 1936, but the cemetery was not formally dedicated until May 30, 1941. In 2019, The Durable Restoration Company provided restoration of the exterior Tudor style stone facade and slate roof.

Notable monuments 
The memorial area of the cemetery has monuments representing each of the six United States Marine Corps divisions from World War II.

Notable interments 
 Medal of Honor recipients
 Fireman, First Class Loddie Stupka (1878–1946), Medal of Honor recipient for peacetime service in the United States Navy.
 Other notable burials
 CW2 Joseph B. Aviles, Sr. (1897–1990), the first Hispanic promoted to chief petty officer and later the first Hispanic to be promoted to chief warrant officer in the United States Coast Guard.
 Hattie Carroll (1911–1963), murder victim whose death was the subject of Bob Dylan's song "The Lonesome Death of Hattie Carroll".
 Rear Admiral Leo Otis Colbert (1883–1968), third Director, United States Coast and Geodetic Survey Corps (1938–50).
 Elijah Stansbury Jr. (1791–1883), Mayor of Baltimore, member of the Maryland House of Delegates, soldier in War of 1812
 Waters Edward Turpin (1910–1968), author during the Harlem Renaissance, United States Navy

Gallery

References

External links

 National Cemetery Administration
 Baltimore National Cemetery
 Interment.net: Baltimore National Cemetery
 
 
 

Catonsville, Maryland
Cemeteries in Baltimore
Historic American Landscapes Survey in Maryland
United States national cemeteries
Cemeteries on the National Register of Historic Places in Baltimore
National Register of Historic Places in Baltimore County, Maryland
Cemeteries in Maryland
Buildings and structures in Baltimore County, Maryland